Brookside Cemetery in Winnipeg, Manitoba, is the largest cemetery in western Canada, containing the graves of more than 200,000 people. With the first interment taking place in 1878, it is one of the oldest cemeteries in Winnipeg.

Brookside has been used in some films, such as Bride of Chucky (1998).

Memorials 
The Brookside Cemetery houses a municipal Military "Field of Honour," which was opened in 1915 and is one of Canada's largest and oldest. The Field of Honour houses the only Stone of Remembrance in Canada, unveiled in 1960 by the Commonwealth War Graves Commission to honour "sailors, soldiers and airmen of the Commonwealth who lie buried in Canada," having served in either of the world wars. Since 1915, Brookside Cemetery has interred 11,000 veterans, servicemen, and women, and includes 470 war graves.

Brookside also includes a section dedicated to those who donated their bodies to medical research and teaching at the University of Manitoba. Since 1952, the University has conducted an annual burial and committal service known as the "Service After Death" as a tribute to such people. A monument and plaque were dedicated on 27 June 2003.

The firefighter section of the cemetery includes a monument commemorating local firefighters.

Other memorials include:

 Korean War Veterans memorial
 Hong Kong Veterans cairn – honour members of C Force in the Battle of Hong Kong (namely members of Winnipeg Grenadiers)
 Last Post Fund columbaria 
 Dugald Train Wreck memorial

Notable graves
Notable graves at Brookside Cemetery include:
 "Bulldog Bob" Brown (1938–1997), professional wrestler
 Harry Colebourn (1887–1947), owner of Winnipeg the bear (Winnie the Pooh)
 Francis Evans Cornish (1831–1878), first mayor of Winnipeg
 Tommy Dunderdale  (1887–1960), NHA hockey player
 Chris Fridfinnson (1898–1938), Olympic Games gold medalist
 Charles Gardiner (1904–1934), NHL hockey player
Faron Hall (1964–2014), homeless man who gained notoriety after rescuing several people from drowning in several separate incidents
 Haldor Halderson (1900–1965), NHL hockey player
 Stanley Howard Knowles (1908–1997), politician (federal NDP MP)
 Bill Mosienko (1921–1994), NHL hockey player
 Alfred Paget (1879–1919), silent films actor
 Gestur Pálsson (1852–1891), Icelandic author and newspaper editor
 Tommy Prince (1915–1977), Canadian war hero
Phoenix Sinclair (2000–2005), murder victim
 Jane Elizabeth Vasey (1949–1982), blues musician
 Kurt Winter (1946–1997), musician
 the 31 victims of the 1947 rail accident in Dugald, Manitoba – buried in a large communal grave

References

External links
 
 

Cemeteries in Manitoba
Military cemeteries
Buildings and structures in Winnipeg